The Islands District Council is the district council for the Islands District in Hong Kong. It is one of 18 such councils. The Islands District currently consists of 18 members, of which the district is divided into 10 constituencies, electing a total of 10 with 8 ex-officio members who is the Peng Chau, Lamma North, Tung Chung, Lamma South, Tai O, Lantau South, Mui Wo and Cheung Chau rural committee chairmen. The latest election was held on 24 November 2019.

History

The Islands District Council was established on 1 April 1981 under the name of the Islands District Board as the result of the colonial Governor Murray MacLehose's District Administration Scheme reform. The District Board was partly elected with the ex-officio Regional Council members and chairmen of eight Rural Committees, Peng Chau, Lamma North, Tung Chung, Lamma South, Tai O, Lantau South, Mui Wo and Cheung Chau, as well as members appointed by the Governor until 1994 when last Governor Chris Patten refrained from appointing any member.

The Islands District Board became the Islands Provisional District Board after the Hong Kong Special Administrative Region (HKSAR) was established in 1997 with the appointment system being reintroduced by Chief Executive Tung Chee-hwa. The current Islands District Council was established on 1 January 2000 after the first District Council election in 1999. The appointed seats were abolished in 2015 after the modified constitutional reform proposal was passed by the Legislative Council in 2010.

The Islands District Council has the most number of eight ex-officio seats and is dominated by the rural forces. As the Tung Chung new town was developed in the early 2000s, some political parties have also successfully made attempts in those areas, notably Tang Ka-piu of the Hong Kong Federation of Trade Unions (FTU) in Yat Tung Estate North and Holden Chow of the Democratic Alliance for the Betterment and Progress of Hong Kong (DAB) in Tung Chung South. Amy Yung Wing-sheung of the pro-democracy Civic Party has also held Discovery Bay since 2000.

In the historic landslide victory in 2019 election, Islands District Council became the only council where pro-democrats gained the majority of the elected seats but failed to take control of the council due to the 8 ex-officio seats. However, the pro-democrats got 7 of the 10 elected seats and ousted DAB legislator Holden Chow for District Council (Second) from his seat.

Political control
Since 1982 political control of the council has been held by the following parties:

Political makeup

Elections are held every four years.

District result maps

Members represented
Starting from 1 January 2020:

Leadership

Chairs
Since 1985, the chairman is elected by all the members of the board:

Vice Chairs

Notes

References

 
Districts of Hong Kong
Islands District